Haydn Joseph Hollis (born 14 October 1992) is an English footballer who plays for Ebbsfleet United. A defender, he has played in the Football League with Notts County and Forest Green Rovers, and has also played on loan in the Conference for Barrow, Hinckley United, Darlington and Chesterfield, before signing for Ebbsfleet United in the summer of 2022.

Club career

Notts County
Hollis completed a two-year scholarship at Notts County, and signed a one-year professional contract with the club before the 2011–12 season. He joined Barrow of the Conference on loan for a month in September 2011. He scored on his debut the following day to open the scoring as Barrow went on to win 2–1 at Alfreton Town, (a team he'd represented at youth level) but sustained an ankle injury in training which restricted him to just three league games while at the club.

Hollis made his first-team debut for Notts County on 2 January 2012, playing the full 90 minutes as County came back from 2–0 down to draw at home to Huddersfield Town. This made him the first player to progress from the club's Centre of Excellence to a first-team start since its re-opening in 2008.

In March, Hollis signed for Conference club Darlington on loan until the end of the season. He went straight into the starting eleven for the visit to Kidderminster Harriers, a 3–1 defeat, and started all their remaining games, scoring the opening goal of the 2–2 draw with Bath City that confirmed Darlington's relegation from the Conference.

On 11 March 2014, Hollis made his first appearance of the 2013–14 season as he replaced the injured Dean Leacock after 38 minutes of a 3–1 defeat at home to MK Dons. He impressed enough to start the next game, a 3–2 defeat to Tranmere Rovers, and in the following game he scored twice as Notts County beat Carlisle United 4–1 at Meadow Lane. He scored again two games later, in a 2–0 win against Colchester United.

Forest Green Rovers
On 9 January 2018, Hollis joined Forest Green Rovers on a free transfer, having fallen out of favour at Notts County.

On 23 August 2018, Hollis joined National League club Chesterfield on loan for the duration of the 2018–19 season. He was released by Forest Green Rovers at the end of the 2018–19 season.

Chesterfield
Following his release by Forest Green Rovers, Hollis joined former loan club Chesterfield on a one-year deal on 24 May 2019.

Ebbsfleet United
On 1 July 2022, Hollis joined National League South club Ebbsfleet United.

Career statistics

References

External links
 
 Profile at Notts County F.C. website

1992 births
Living people
English footballers
Association football defenders
Notts County F.C. players
Barrow A.F.C. players
Darlington F.C. players
Forest Green Rovers F.C. players
Chesterfield F.C. players
Ebbsfleet United F.C. players
English Football League players
National League (English football) players